ECTA may refer to:
 Econometrica, an academic journal of economics
European Competitive Telecommunications Association
 Diaminobutyrate acetyltransferase, an enzyme